Danilo Sekulić (born 18 April 1990) is a Serbian professional footballer who plays as a midfielder for Mladost Novi Sad.

Career

He passed through all categories of Vojvodina, but, he never got a chance in first team. He has gained experience playing for Proleter Novi Sad, where he was one of the best players. Hajduk Kula brought him to their team, but he played just one season, because this club dropped from participation in Jelen SuperLiga of non-football reasons. In summer of 2013, he joined to Voždovac as free agent.

Statistics

Honours
Proleter
Serbian League Vojvodina: 2008–09

References

External links
 24 Секулић Данило at http://fkvozdovac.rs
 Danilo Sekulić at jelenfootball.com
 
 

1990 births
Sportspeople from Sombor
Living people
Serbian footballers
Association football midfielders
FK Proleter Novi Sad players
FK Hajduk Kula players
FK Voždovac players
FK Vojvodina players
Debreceni VSC players
FC Alashkert players
FK Mladost Lučani players
PS Barito Putera players
FK Kabel players
Serbian First League players
Serbian SuperLiga players
Nemzeti Bajnokság I players
Armenian Premier League players
Liga 1 (Indonesia) players
Serbian expatriate footballers
Expatriate footballers in Hungary
Serbian expatriate sportspeople in Hungary
Expatriate footballers in Armenia
Serbian expatriate sportspeople in Armenia
Expatriate footballers in Indonesia
Serbian expatriate sportspeople in Indonesia